Eugene (Gene) Frederick Flasch is a Canadian politician who was the NDP MLA for Maple Creek between 1971 and 1975.

References

External links 
 List of MLAs

Living people
Saskatchewan New Democratic Party MLAs
20th-century Canadian politicians
Year of birth missing (living people)